40P/Väisälä is a periodic comet that was discovered on February 8, 1939. Its orbit was determined on April 26, 1939. In 1994, the diameter of its nucleus was found to be 4.2 km, similar in size to that of Comet Encke.

Discovery 
Comet Väisälä was discovered accidentally on photographs exposed for minor planets. Originally, it was given the asteroid designation 1939 CB. However, additional findings revealed that the object was of cometary nature. The visual magnitude of Väisälä at the time of its discovery was 15. The orbital characteristics of the new comet at the time of its discovery were "a period of about 10 years, a perihelion date of 1939 April 26.0, and a perihelion distance of 1.75 AU."

Close Approaches 

The orbit of Comet Väisälä resembles that of many centaurs, and is therefore unstable over thousands of years due to gravitational interactions with the gas giant Jupiter. One such close approach, 0.41 AU on December 31, 1961, increased its perihelion distance from 1.74 AU to 1.87 AU and increased its orbital period from 10.46 to 11.28 years. On September 21, 1973, an approach of Jupiter 1 AU away decreased perihelion distance from 1.87 AU to 1.80 AU decreased orbital period from 11.28 to 10.88 years. Väisälä will make one more close approach in the 21st century, but it will have a minimal effect. However, in the year 2127, the comet will make a close approach of only 0.096 AU from Jupiter, and reduce perihelion to 1.4 AU.

References

External links 
 Elements and Ephemeris for 40P/Vaisala – Minor Planet Center

Periodic comets
0040
Discoveries by Yrjö Väisälä
Comets in 2014
19390208